The following lists events that happened in 2013 in Lebanon.

Incumbents
President: Michel Suleiman 
Prime Minister: Najib Mikati

 
Lebanon
2010s in Lebanon
Years of the 21st century in Lebanon
Lebanon